Palla Road railway station is a Kolkata Suburban Railway station on the Howrah–Bardhaman chord line. It is operated by Eastern Railway zone of Indian Railways. It is situated beside Duragapur Expressway at Sahapur, Belut, Palla Road in Purba Bardhaman district in the Indian state of West Bengal.

History
The Howrah–Bardhaman chord, the 95 kilometers railway line was constructed in 1917. It was connected with  through Dankuni after construction of Vivekananda Setu in 1932. Howrah–Bardhaman chord including Palla Road railway station was electrified in 1964–66.

References

Railway stations in Purba Bardhaman district
Howrah railway division
Kolkata Suburban Railway stations